Adenosylhomocysteinase (S-adenosylhomocysteine synthase, S-adenosylhomocysteine hydrolase, adenosylhomocysteine hydrolase, S-adenosylhomocysteinase, SAHase, AdoHcyase) is an enzyme that converts S-adenosylhomocysteine to homocysteine and adenosine. This enzyme catalyses the following chemical reaction

 S-adenosyl-L-homocysteine + H2O  L-homocysteine + adenosine

The enzyme contains one tightly bound NAD+ per subunit. The mechanism involves dehydrogenative oxidation of the 3'-OH of the ribose.  The resulting ketone is susceptible to α-deprotonation.  The resulting carbanion eliminates thiolate.  The a,b-unsaturated ketone is then hydrated, and the ketone is reduced by the NADH.

This enzyme is encoded by the AHCY gene in humans, which is believed to have a prognostic role in neuroblastoma.

References

External links

Further reading 
 
 
 

EC 3.3.1